















2011 UEMOA Tournament